Seljuk or Saljuq (سلجوق) may refer to:
 Seljuk Empire (1051–1153), a medieval empire in the Middle East and central Asia
 Seljuk dynasty (c. 950–1307), the ruling dynasty of the Seljuk Empire and subsequent polities
 Seljuk (warlord) (died c. 1038), founder of the Seljuk dynasty 
 Seljuk Sultanate of Rum (1060–1307), a medieval empire founded by later members of the dynasty

See also
 Seljuk Tower, the 11th tallest building in Turkey
 Saljuq-nama, a 12th-century history of the Great Seljuk Empire
 Seljuki Khatun (died 1189), the wife of Caliph al-Nasir
 Uyanış: Büyük Selçuklu, a Turkish television series
 Selçuk (disambiguation)